Maja Tatić (born October 30, 1970 in Belgrade, SFR Yugoslavia) is a Serbian Bosnian singer. She represented Bosnia and Herzegovina at the 2002 Eurovision Song Contest.

At the age of seven, she appeared in a children's contest and started her professional career as a singer when she was 17. Tatić sang in bands such as Monaco, Sonus, and Skitnice.

In 1992, Tatić went to the Canary Islands, where she entertained the people with her renditions of songs by ABBA, Tina Turner and Shania Twain. She performed there for eight years.

In 2002, Tatić was chosen to represent Bosnia and Herzegovina at the Eurovision Song Contest with a song "Na jastuku za dvoje" and took joint 13th place. After that she participated in several festivals around the Balkans.

Discography

Albums

 2004: Lagali su me
 2008: Moja te je dusa poznala

References

External links
Maja Tatic's official website

1970 births
Living people
Eurovision Song Contest entrants for Bosnia and Herzegovina
Eurovision Song Contest entrants of 2002
Singers from Belgrade
20th-century Serbian women singers
21st-century Serbian women singers
Serbs of Bosnia and Herzegovina